In zoological nomenclature, a type species (species typica) is the species name with which the name of a genus or subgenus is considered to be permanently taxonomically associated, i.e., the species that contains the biological type specimen(s). A similar concept is used for suprageneric groups and called a type genus.

In botanical nomenclature, these terms have no formal standing under the code of nomenclature, but are sometimes borrowed from zoological nomenclature. In botany, the type of a genus name is a specimen (or, rarely, an illustration) which is also the type of a species name. The species name that has that type can also be referred to as the type of the genus name. Names of genus and family ranks, the various subdivisions of those ranks, and some higher-rank names based on genus names, have such types.

In bacteriology, a type species is assigned for each genus.

Every named genus or subgenus in zoology, whether or not currently recognized as valid, is theoretically associated with a type species. In practice, however, there is a backlog of untypified names defined in older publications when it was not required to specify a type.

Use in zoology 

A type species is both a concept and a practical system that is used in the classification and nomenclature (naming) of animals. The "type species" represents the reference species and thus "definition" for a particular genus name. Whenever a taxon containing multiple species must be divided into more than one genus, the type species automatically assigns the name of the original taxon to one of the resulting new taxa, the one that includes the type species.

The term "type species" is regulated in zoological nomenclature by article 42.3 of the International Code of Zoological Nomenclature, which defines a type species as the name-bearing type of the name of a genus or subgenus (a "genus-group name"). In the Glossary, type species is defined as

The type species permanently attaches a formal name (the generic name) to a genus by providing just one species within that genus to which the genus name is permanently linked (i.e. the genus must include that species if it is to bear the name). The species name in turn is fixed, in theory, to a type specimen.

For example, the type species for the land snail genus Monacha is Helix cartusiana, the name under which the species was first described, known as Monacha cartusiana when placed in the genus Monacha. That genus is currently placed within the family Hygromiidae. The type genus for that family is the genus Hygromia.

The concept of the type species in zoology was introduced by Pierre André Latreille.

Citing
The International Code of Zoological Nomenclature states that the original name (binomen) of the type species should always be cited. It gives an example in Article 67.1. Astacus marinus  was later designated as the type species of the genus Homarus, thus giving it the name Homarus marinus . Even though, as a result of synonymy, this species was originally named as Cancer gammarus, the type species of Homarus should always be cited under its original designation as a type species: Astacus marinus .

Although the International Code of Nomenclature for algae, fungi, and plants does not contain the same explicit statement, examples make it clear that the original name is used, so that the "type species" of a genus name need not have a name within that genus. Thus in Article 10, Ex. 3, the type of the genus name Elodes is quoted as the type of the species name Hypericum aegypticum, not as the type of the species name Elodes aegyptica. (Elodes is not now considered distinct from Hypericum.)

See also
 Glossary of scientific naming
 Genetypes – genetic sequence data from type specimens.
 Holotype
 Paratype
 Principle of typification
 Type (and type specimen)
 Type genus

References 

Botanical nomenclature
Taxonomy (biology)
Zoological nomenclature